Arthur Hodge (died January 1749) was a British colonial governor. He was Deputy Governor of Anguilla from 30 June 1741 until 28 January 1749. He was in charge of defending the island during 1745 when the small British garrison defeated an attempt by 760 French soldiers and marines to capture the place in June.

References

Deputy Governors of Anguilla
1749 deaths
Year of birth unknown